The Youth or The Youths may refer to:

HaTzeirim, an Israeli political faction
The Youth, a Filipino rock band
Ijahman Levi, a Jamaican reggae singer was originally known by this name
A song on American musical duo MGMT's first album Oracular Spectacular
Al-Shabab (disambiguation), "The Youth", 
The Youths (1929 film), a German silent film

See also
 Wexford Youths F.C., an Irish association football club nicknamed "The Youths"
 Youth (disambiguation)